The Immaculate Conception Cathedral  also called Iquique Cathedral It is a cathedral church of Catholic worship, home of the Roman Catholic Diocese of Iquique in the northern part of the South American country of Chile. It was consecrated in 1882 under the patronage of the Immaculate Conception of Mary.

It was built thanks to the fund campaign initiated by the Apostolic Vicar Camilo Ortuzar, after the parish church of Iquique was destroyed by fire on May 10, 1833. In May 1884 the remains of Arturo Prat and others who fell in the naval Battle of Iquique were transferred to the temple, where they remained until moved to Valparaiso in 1888, and in 1885 its construction was completed. In 1929, due to the creation of the Diocese of Iquique, the church acquired the rank of Cathedral.

In 1989 the cathedral, together with the parochial houses attached to it, was declared a historical monument (Monumento histórico).

See also
Roman Catholicism in Chile
Immaculate Conception Cathedral

References

Roman Catholic cathedrals in Chile
Buildings and structures in Tarapacá Region
Roman Catholic churches completed in 1885
Iquique
19th-century Roman Catholic church buildings in Chile
Rebuilt buildings and structures in Chile
Neoclassical church buildings in Chile